Aleksandrs Obižajevs (born 16 September 1959) is a retired pole vaulter who represented the USSR and later Latvia. His personal best jump was 5.80 metres, achieved in July 1987 in Bryansk. His result of 5.74 metres in 1983 placed him second on the top performers list during the indoor season that year, behind American Billy Olson.

He competed for Latvia at the 1992 Summer Olympics and the 1996 Summer Olympics.

Achievements

References

External links
 
 Aleksandrs Obižajevs at the Latvijas Vieglatlētikas Savienība 
 
 
 

1959 births
Living people
Latvian male pole vaulters
Soviet male pole vaulters
Olympic athletes of Latvia
Athletes (track and field) at the 1992 Summer Olympics
Athletes (track and field) at the 1996 Summer Olympics